Anco Jansen (born 9 March 1989) is a Dutch professional footballer who plays as a forward for Tweede Klasse club DZOH Emmen. He formerly played for Zwolle, Groningen, Cambuur, Veendam, De Graafschap, Roda JC and Emmen.

Club career

PSM Makassar
On 20 June 2021, Jansen moved to Indonesia and signed one-year contract with Liga 1 side PSM Makassar. He made his league debut on 5 September by starting in a 1–1 draw against Arema.

He became the most expensive foreign player in the Liga 1. Jansen is estimated to be worth €400,000. His presence shifted Marc Klok who previously held the title of the most expensive player. On 18 September 2021, Jansen scored his first league goal for PSM with a brace in 2021-22 Liga 1, earning them a 3–1 win over Persebaya Surabaya.

References

External links
 Anco Jansen at Soccerway
 Voetbal International profile 

1989 births
Living people
Dutch footballers
Sportspeople from Zwolle
Footballers from Overijssel
Association football midfielders
PEC Zwolle players
SC Cambuur players
SC Veendam players
De Graafschap players
Roda JC Kerkrade players
Boluspor footballers
FC Emmen players
NAC Breda players
PSM Makassar players
Eredivisie players
Eerste Divisie players
Liga 1 (Indonesia) players
Dutch expatriate footballers
Expatriate footballers in Turkey
Dutch expatriate sportspeople in Turkey
Dutch expatriate sportspeople in Indonesia
Expatriate footballers in Indonesia